The Persada Johor International Convention Centre is a convention center in Johor Bahru, Johor, Malaysia. It is a member of the Johor Corporation Group of Companies.

Name
Persada is taken from Malay language which means a place which has steps for a royal member to sit and conduct official matters.

History
The area where the convention center stands today used to be the site for Johor Military Force (JMF) camp and early remnants of Johor Bahru.

Architecture
The convention center area spreads over an area of 2.43 hectares, with the building covers an area of 1.69 hectares. The building was designed with a roof that resembles the official hat of Johor Sultanate. The convention center consists of convention halls, meeting rooms, exhibition halls, auditorium and restaurant.

Transportation
The convention center is accessible by Muafakat Bus route P-101.

See also
 List of tourist attractions in Johor

References

2006 establishments in Malaysia
Buildings and structures in Johor Bahru
Convention centres in Malaysia
South Johor Economic Region
Tourist attractions in Johor